Garuda Dhwaja is a 1991 Kannada film, directed by N. S. Raj Bharath, starring Ambareesh, Ramesh Aravind and Avinash. The movie is a remake of the 1984 Hindi movie Meri Adalat, directed by Kannada director A. T. Raghu which itself was loosely based on the 1983 Kannada movie Aasha also directed by A. T. Raghu and starring Ambareesh.

Cast
Ambareesh as Inspector Garuda
Ramesh Aravind
Avinash
Sadashiva Brahmavar

References

1991 films
1990s Kannada-language films
Films scored by Hamsalekha
Films directed by N. S. Rajbharath